2008 World Cup may refer to:

2008 Rugby League World Cup
2008 Alpine Skiing World Cup
2008 VIVA World Cup
2008 World Cup (men's golf)
Speedway World Cup 2008
FIFA Futsal World Cup 2008
FIFA Club World Cup 2008

See also
 2008 Continental Championships (disambiguation)
 2008 World Championships (disambiguation)
 2008 World Junior Championships (disambiguation)
 2008 Australian Football International Cup